Mauro Gabriel Airez (born 26 October 1968) is an Argentine retired footballer who played as a striker. 

He participated in the 1988 Summer Olympics, and later appeared for the Argentina national team.

Club career
Airez was born in Buenos Aires, and arrived at Gimnasia La Plata at age 18, competing briefly for the youth ranks, before debuting for the main team, helping the achieve a fifth place in the 1987–88 season and adding over 50 league games in two seasons, reaching the national olympic team.

In 1989, he moved to Argentinos Juniors, staying just one season, reaching the Argentina national team, playing alongside Maradona, Simeone or Redondo. In 1991, he had a short stint at Independiente, before moving to Italian side, Bari, a year later.

Without competing in the Biancorossi, Bari intended to ship him Portugal, so he asked Héctor Yazalde for advice, and he promptly told him he should do it. His first season in the Belém side was in the second tier, scoring a career best eleven goals.

Following six seasons, the 27-year-old joined Benfica in December 1995, debuting on 12 January 1996, appearing sporadically in the 18 months he spent there, acting as second choice to players like  Donizete or Valdir; his biggest achievement arrived in the 1996 Taça de Portugal Final, with Benfica defeating Sporting CP by 3–1, and Aírez scoring the opener.

In 1997, he moved to Estrela da Amadora, helping the side finish eight place in 1997–98 season, ending his career a year later, at Estoril-Praia, aged 31.

Honours
Benfica
 Taça de Portugal: 1995–96

References

External links
 
 

1968 births
Living people
Argentine footballers
Footballers from Buenos Aires
Association football forwards
Argentine Primera División players
Club de Gimnasia y Esgrima La Plata footballers
Club Atlético Independiente footballers
Argentinos Juniors footballers
S.S.C. Bari players
Serie B players
Primeira Liga players
C.F. Os Belenenses players
S.L. Benfica footballers
Liga Portugal 2 players
C.F. Estrela da Amadora players
G.D. Estoril Praia players
Argentina international footballers
Footballers at the 1988 Summer Olympics
Olympic footballers of Argentina
Argentine expatriate sportspeople in Portugal
Expatriate footballers in Portugal
Pan American Games bronze medalists for Argentina
Medalists at the 1987 Pan American Games
Footballers at the 1987 Pan American Games
Pan American Games medalists in football